Luiz Altamir Lopes Melo (born 9 May 1996 in Boa Vista) is a Brazilian swimmer.

International career

2013–16

He was at the 2013 FINA World Junior Swimming Championships, in Dubai, United Arab Emirates, where he finished 5th in the 200-metre butterfly, 6th in the 4x200-metre freestyle relay, 8th in the 200-metre freestyle, and 10th in the 400-metre freestyle.

At the 2014 Summer Youth Olympics in Nanjing, he won a silver medal in the Mixed 4 × 100 m freestyle relay. He also finished 5th in the 200 metre butterfly, and 7th in the 200 metre freestyle and 400 metre freestyle.

At the 2015 Pan American Games in Toronto, Ontario, Canada, Altamir won a gold medal in the 4×200-metre freestyle relay, where he broke the Pan Am Games record with a time of 7:11.15, along with João de Lucca, Thiago Pereira, and Nicolas Oliveira.

At the 2015 World Aquatics Championships in Kazan, he finished 15th in the Men's 4 × 200 metre freestyle relay, along with João de Lucca, Thiago Pereira, and Nicolas Oliveira.

At the Open tournament held in Palhoça in December 2015, he obtained qualification for the 2016 Summer Olympics in the 400-metre freestyle, with a time of 3:50.32, 0.7 seconds from the South American record.

2016 Summer Olympics

At the 2016 Summer Olympics, he finished 32nd in the Men's 400 metre freestyle. He also competed in the Men's 4 × 200 metre freestyle relay, where the Brazilian relay finished in 15th place.

2016–20

At the 2018 Pan Pacific Swimming Championships in Tokyo, Japan, he finished 4th in the Men's 4 × 200 metre freestyle relay, 8th in the Men's 200 metre freestyle and 19th in the Men's 400 metre freestyle.

At the 2018 FINA World Swimming Championships (25 m) in Hangzhou, China, Luiz Altamir Melo, along with Fernando Scheffer, Leonardo Coelho Santos and Breno Correia, surprised the world by winning the gold medal in the Men's 4 × 200 metre freestyle relay, breaking the world record, with a time of 6:46.81. The relay was composed only of young people between 19 and 23 years and was not favorite to gold. He also finished 6th in the Men's 200 metre butterfly and 8th in the Men's 200 metre freestyle.

At the 2019 World Aquatics Championships in Gwangju, South Korea, Brazil's young 4 × 200 metre freestyle relay team, now with João de Lucca instead of Leonardo Coelho Santos, lowered the South American record in almost 3 seconds, with a time of 7:07.12, at heats. They finished 7th, with a time of 7:07.64 in the final. It was the first time that Brazil's 4x200m freestyle relay had qualified for a World Championships final, and the result qualified Brazil for the Tokyo 2020 Olympics. He also finished 13th in the Men's 200 metre butterfly, and 15th in the Men's 400 metre freestyle.

At the 2019 Pan American Games held in Lima, Peru, he won a gold medal in the Men's 4 × 200 metre freestyle relay, breaking the Pan American Games record; a silver medal in the Men's 4 × 100 metre medley relay (by participating at heats); and a bronze medal in the Men's 400 metre freestyle. He also finished 4th in the Men's 200 metre butterfly.

He competed at the 2020 Summer Olympics.

Notes

References

External links 
 
 
 
 

1996 births
Living people
Brazilian male freestyle swimmers
Brazilian male butterfly swimmers
Male butterfly swimmers
World record holders in swimming
Medalists at the FINA World Swimming Championships (25 m)
Olympic swimmers of Brazil
Swimmers at the 2014 Summer Youth Olympics
Swimmers at the 2016 Summer Olympics
Swimmers at the 2020 Summer Olympics
Pan American Games medalists in swimming
Pan American Games gold medalists for Brazil
Swimmers at the 2015 Pan American Games
Swimmers at the 2019 Pan American Games
Medalists at the 2015 Pan American Games
Medalists at the 2019 Pan American Games
People from Boa Vista, Roraima
Sportspeople from Roraima